Vivaxosaurus is a genus of dicynodont from Late Permian (Changhsingian) of Russia. It has been found at Sokolki on the Northern Dvina River near Kotlas in Arkhangelsk Oblast, Russia. It lived during the latest Permian, and was a contemporary of Inostrancevia, Scutosaurus and Dvinia. Like all members of the genus, this animal was toothless, except for prominent tusks, and probably cropped vegetation with a horny beak, like a tortoise.

History
 
The contemporary species Dicynodon amalitzkii Sushkin, 1926 is closely related (Angielczyk and Kurkin 2003a, 2003b), although according to Lucas 2005, Dicynodon trautscholdi, Dicynodon amalitzkii, Elph borealis, and Vivaxosaurus permirus are all synonyms, which makes D. amalitzkii the junior synonym of D. trautscholdi. Other suggested synonyms are Gordonia annae Amalitskii, 1922, Oudenodon venyokovi Amalitskii, 1922, and Dicynodon annae (Amalitskii, 1922).

In 2011, Vivaxosaurus permirus and Dicynodon trautscholdi were combined as Vivaxosaurus trautscholdi. This same study also moved D. amalitzkii to the genus Peramodon.  In 2012, the species D. trautscholdi was moved to the genus Fortunodon, independently of its synonymization with V. permirus; this makes Fortunodon a subjective junior synonym of Vivaxosaurus trautscholdi.

References

Dicynodonts
Lopingian synapsids of Europe
Extinct animals of Russia
Anomodont genera